Ilias Melkas (born 7 October 1989) is a Greek professional footballer who plays as a goalkeeper for Ermis Aradippou in Cyprus. He was born to ethnic Greek parents in Korçe, Albania.

Career
Melkas debuted for Iraklis in a Greek Superleague match against Skoda Xanthi FC on 26 April 2009.

Personal life
Ilias was born in Northern Epirus. His father Giannis Melkas was an international volleyball player

References

External links

Greek footballers
Greek expatriate footballers
1989 births
Living people
Iraklis Thessaloniki F.C. players
Korinthos F.C. players
Anagennisi Karditsa F.C. players
Panserraikos F.C. players
A.E. Karaiskakis F.C. players
Luftëtari Gjirokastër players
Super League Greece players
Association football goalkeepers
Footballers from Korçë
Albanian footballers